Bwa (Boa, Boua, Bua, Kibua, Kibwa, Libua, Libwali) is a Bantu language spoken in the Democratic Republic of Congo. 

Dialects are
Leboa-Le (Bwa proper)
Yewu
Kiba
Benge (Libenge)
Bati (Baati)
Boganga (Boyanga)
Ligbe

Pagibete is close, and might be considered another dialect.

References

Bwa languages
Languages of the Democratic Republic of the Congo